The Fair Work Commission (FWC), until 2013 known as Fair Work Australia (FWA), is the Australian industrial relations tribunal created by the Fair Work Act 2009 as part of the Rudd Government's reforms to industrial relations in Australia. Operations commenced on 1 July 2009. It is the successor of the Australian Industrial Relations Commission, and also performs functions previously performed by the Workplace Authority and the Australian Fair Pay Commission.

The office of President of the Fair Work Commission has been held by Justice Adam Hatcher since 19 February 2023.

, it operates under the portfolio of the Australian Attorney-General, the Hon Mark Dreyfus MP. The general manager of the FWC is Murray Furlong, who was appointed in October of 2021.

FWC's functions include the setting and varying industrial awards, minimum wage fixation, dispute resolution, the approval of enterprise agreements, and handling claims for unfair dismissal.

Role
FWC is an independent workplace relations tribunal with the power and authority to regulate and enforce provisions relating to minimum wages and employment conditions, enterprise bargaining, industrial action, dispute resolution, and termination of employment.

The Fair Work Act is an attempt to create a more national system for regulating industrial relations in Australia. Each state has the discretion to hand over some or all of their industrial relations powers to the Commonwealth, and should a state decide to refer their powers to a centralized and national industrial relations system, all the employees of that state would effectively be covered by the national Fair Work Act. The FWC has taken over the roles of the Australian Industrial Relations Commission (AIRC) in matters of workplace disputes and industrial actions. It is also involved in the process of determining national industrial relations policies, including setting minimum wages and regulating the award system. Since the introduction of the Fair Work Act, all states except Western Australia have referred their powers to the Commonwealth.

Structure
When originally founded, all FWC members were previously members of the Australian Industrial Relations Commission. The FWC has a President (currently vacant), two Vice Presidents, a number of Deputy Presidents and Commissioners. The General Manager reports to the President and is responsible for administration. This position replaced the Industrial Registrar. The inaugural President was Justice Giudice. He retired from this position in February 2012, and was succeeded by former Victorian Supreme Court judge Iain Ross who served from 2012 to 2022.

FWC has members based in Melbourne (M), Sydney (S), Brisbane (B), Newcastle (N), Perth (P), Adelaide (A) and Canberra (C). The members of the FWC, as at February 2023, are:

President 
Justice Adam Hatcher (S)

Vice presidents 
Vice President J Catanzariti (S)

Deputy presidents 
Deputy President I Asbury (B)
Deputy President VP Gostencnik (M)
Deputy President M Binet (P)
Deputy President WR Clancy (M)
Deputy President LE Dean (C)
Deputy President P Anderson (A)
Deputy President AC Colman (M)
Deputy President I Masson (M)
Deputy President A Beaumont (P)
Deputy President A Millhouse (M)
Deputy President T Saunders (S/N)
Deputy President N Lake (B)
Deputy President G Boyce (S)
Deputy President B Cross (S)
Deputy President A Mansini (M)
Deputy President J Young (M)
Deputy President MJ Easton (S)
Deputy President A Bell (M)
Deputy President T Dobson (B)
Deputy President PJ Hampton (A)
Deputy President BM O'Neill (M)

Commissioners 
Commissioner PJ Spencer (B)
Commissioner BD Williams (P)
Commissioner DS McKenna (S)
Commissioner IW Cambridge (S)
Acting Commissioner MP Bissett (M)
Commissioner CF Simpson (B)
Commissioner T Lee (M)
Commissioner B Riordan (S)
Commissioner LAT Johns (S)
Commissioner NP Wilson (M)
Commissioner T Cirkovic (M)
Commissioner C Platt (A)
Commissioner K Harper-Greenwell (M)
Commissioner J Hunt (B)
Commissioner S McKinnon (M)
Commissioner L Yilmaz (M)
Commissioner S Mirabella (M)
Commissioner P Ryan (S)
Commissioner A Matheson (S)
Commissioner P Schneider (P)

Additional members
Additional members are dual appointees with other bodies, or sit part-time as expert panel members:
Deputy President DJ Barclay (Hobart, also President of the Tasmanian Industrial Commission)
The Hon Martin Ferguson AM (Expert Panel Member)
Adele Labin-Romain (Expert Panel Member)
Professor Mark Wooden (Expert Panel Member)

See also
Australian labour law
Fair Work Ombudsman
Australian Building and Construction Commission

References

External links
Official website
Fair Work Ombudsman Award Finder website
Fair Work Infoline website
What is the Fair Work Act?

Australian labour law
Commonwealth Government agencies of Australia
2009 establishments in Australia
Commonwealth of Australia courts and tribunals
Leave of absence
Labour relations organisations in Australia
Labor relations boards
Courts and tribunals established in 2009